Ratu Marika Vukinamualevu Ratoto Latianara (13 March 1913 – 20 August 1983) was a Fijian chief and Senator.

Biography
Latianara was born in Sorokoba on Viti Levu in 1913, the son of Adi Luisa Matai and Ratu Kaliova Vukinamualevu, the Roko Tui of Ba. He became a professional boxer in 1932, initially in the middleweight category, before switching to light heavyweight and then heavyweight, becoming national champion in each classification. He retired undefeated in 1937. He then became a sugarcane farmer and was a member of the Fijian Sugar Council.

In 1959 he was appointed Tui Ba, succeeding his elder brother Filimone, who had died a year earlier, and also became a member of Ba Provincial Council. In 1979 he was appointed to the Senate by the Great Council of Chiefs. He died in Sorokoba in August 1983.

References

1913 births
People from Ba Province
Fijian male boxers
Fijian farmers
Fijian chiefs
Members of the Senate (Fiji)
1983 deaths